Roger Mavity is a business expert, a writer and a photographer.

Biography

He started his career in advertising, setting up his own firm, Mavity Gilmore in 1981. He sold Mavity Gilmore in 1991 and joined Granada Group, where he was Chief Executive of the Leisure Division and then the Technology Division. He also handled PR and communications for Granada's bid for the Forte Group, still the largest successful hostile takeover in UK commercial history. In 2003 he left to join communication consultancy Citigate Dewe Rogerson as Chairman. In 2006 he became Chief Executive of Conran Holdings, the parent company of Terence Conran's business empire. In 2013 he left Conran to concentrate on writing and photography.

He is, with Stephen Bayley, co-author of Life's a Pitch, a best-selling guide to presentation skills. 
In 2013, he brought out The Rule-Breakers Book of Business, an anarchic guide to 
business success. His next book, on creativity, will be published by Penguin Random House later in 2018.
He has also written articles for several British newspapers, including The Observer., The Independent and The Times, and he speaks regularly about business.

He has worked as a photographer since 2008 when he graduated from the University of Westminster with a master's degree in Photographic Studies. His first solo show was held at London's Rebecca Hossack Gallery in March 2009. He has since had one-man shows in London and in Belgium, and his work has been exhibited in art shows in Paris, Amsterdam, Ghent, Brussels and London. He is also a trustee of Pallant House Gallery, Chichester.

References

Living people
British businesspeople
Advertising directors
Year of birth missing (living people)